Franz Mazura (22 April 1924 – 23 January 2020) was an Austrian bass-baritone opera singer and actor. He performed at the Bayreuth Festival from 1971 for 25 years and at the Metropolitan Opera for 15 years. He was made a Kammersänger in 1980 and an Honorary Member of the Nationaltheater Mannheim in 1990. He most often played villains and strange characters, with signature roles including Klingsor in Wagner's Parsifal. Mazura took part in world premieres, such as the double role of Dr. Schön and Jack the Ripper in the world premiere of the completed version of Alban Berg's Lulu at the Paris Opera in 1979, and as Abraham in Giorgio Battistelli's Lot in 2017. Two of his recordings received Grammy Awards. His voice was described as with dark timbre, powerful and like granite ("dunkel gefärbt, kräftig und wie Granit"), with perfect diction.  His acting ability was described as "well-supplied with vivid imaginative touches, whether deployed in comic roles or characters of inexorable malevolence. Mazura could achieve more impact with a lifted eyebrow or a belligerently thrust chin than many artists could with a ten-minute monologue." He had a long career, appearing at the Staatsoper Berlin the night before his 95th birthday.

Life 
Born in Salzburg, Mazura was the son of Maria, a homemaker, and Franz Mazura, a tax inspector. He first studied mechanical engineering. He was drafted in 1942. After World War II, he studied with Frederick Husler at the Hochschule für Musik Detmold, and worked during his studies as an actor at the Landestheater Detmold. He made his debut on the opera stage as a bass at the Staatstheater Kassel in 1949. He then worked at the Staatstheater Mainz, Staatstheater Braunschweig, and Nationaltheater Mannheim, where he was a member of the ensemble from 1958 to 1963. In Mannheim, he was cast more in baritone roles. He recalled the time there as especially pleasant, singing a repertoire of 60 roles and enjoying the collaboration among colleagues. He was a member of the Deutsche Oper Berlin from 1963.

From 1960, he performed at the Salzburg Festival, first as Cassandro in Mozart's La finta semplice, then from 1970 as Pizarro in Beethoven's Fidelio. He had a guest contract with the Hamburg State Opera from 1973. At the Vienna State Opera, he appeared as the Komtur (Commendatore) in Mozart's Don Giovanni, as Pizarro, as La Roche in Capriccio by Richard Strauss and as Jochanaan in Salome, among others. Mazura appeared at the Bayreuth Festival from 1971 for 25 years. He sang the roles of Alberich and Gunther in Der Ring des Nibelungen, Biterolf in Tannhäuser, Marke in Tristan und Isolde, and finally Klingsor in Parsifal.  His other Mozart roles included the Speaker of the Temple of Wisdom in Die Zauberflöte.

In 1976, Mazura performed as Alberich in Wagner's Das Rheingold under Georg Solti, staged by Peter Stein. On 24 February 1979, he appeared in the double role of Dr. Schön and Jack the Ripper in the world premiere of the completed version of Alban Berg's Lulu at the Paris Opera, conducted by Pierre Boulez and directed by Patrice Chéreau. In the same opera and theatre, he appeared as Schigolch, first in 2003. He also performed roles such as Scarpia in Puccini's Tosca, the Doctor in Berg's Wozzeck, and in Viktor Ullmann's Der Kaiser von Atlantis. Although he was typecast as a villain, he appeared at Bayreuth a few times in other roles, such as Gurnemanz in Parsifal in 1973, with Eugen Jochum conducting, and Wanderer in Siegfried in 1988, conducted by Daniel Barenboim.

Mazura first appeared at the Metropolitan Opera in New York City in 1980, at age 56, as Dr. Schön/Jack the Ripper in Lulu. He returned regularly for 15 years. A reviewer wrote:  Among Mazura's roles at the Met was Alberich in Der Ring des Nibelungen in 1981, conducted by Erich Leinsdorf. In Siegfried, reviewer Donal Henahan found him and Heinz Zednik as Mime the most interesting in their character roles. The same year, he appeared as Creon in Stavinsky's Oedipus Rex. He performed as Gurnemanz and Pizarro in 1983, as Count Waldner in Arabella by Richard Strauss in 1984, alongside Kiri Te Kanawa in the title role and conducted by Marek Janowski, and as the Doctor in Wozzeck in 1995. After repeating Lulu and Parsifal, he was Frank in a new production of Die Fledermaus by Johann Strauss in 1986, and Mr. Flint in Britten's Billy Budd in 1989. His last performances at the Met were again in Lulu, now in the role of Schigolch for three performances in April 2002.

Mazura appeared in 2006 in the narrating role of Charon in Henze's Das Floß der Medusa, which was performed for the composer's 80th birthday at the Berliner Philharmonie, conducted by Simon Rattle, and with Christian Gerhaher as Jean-Charles and Camilla Nylund as La Mort.

Mazura's career as an opera singer was extremely long. He performed in 2017 in the world premiere of Giorgio Battistelli's opera Lot, in the role of Abraham, at age 93.  In April 2019, he performed as Meister Hans Schwarz in Wagner's Die Meistersinger von Nürnberg at the Staatsoper Berlin. The final performance of this run was on 21 April, the night before Mazura's 95th birthday.

Mazura lived in Edingen-Neckarhausen since 1964. He died on 23 January 2020.

Recordings 
Mazura can be seen on DVD as Gunther in the Jahrhundertring production of Der Ring des Nibelungen, Klingsor in Parsifal, Biterolf in Tannhäuser, Prison-Warden Frank in Die Fledermaus, and Doktor Schön in Lulu.

Discography

Awards 
Mazura appears on two Grammy Award winning recordings: as Dr. Schön in Lulu, conducted by Pierre Boulez (Best Opera Recording 1980),  and as Moses in Schoenberg's Moses und Aron, conducted by Sir Georg Solti (Best Opera Recording 1985).

Mazura was made an honorary member of the Nationaltheater Mannheim in 1990. He was awarded the Officer's Cross of the Order of Merit of the Federal Republic of Germany in 2010. In 2015, he received  the German theatre prize Der Faust for Lifetime Achievement.

References

Further reading 

 Corriere della Sera, "La "Lulu" di Berg seduce la Scala", 26 March 2010 (in Italian, accessed 13 April 2010)
 Cummings, David (ed.), "Mazura, Franz", International Who's Who in Music, Routledge, 2000, p. 426. 
 Buderer, Hans-Jürgen and Homering, Liselotte, Die Oper, Spiegelbild der Welt: Franz Mazura, der Sänger-Schauspieler, Wernersche Verlagsgesellschaft, 2004 (Festschrift for the 80th birthday of Franz Mazura, in German). 
 Mazura, Franz, Franz Mazura – Mit Tusche und Notenband, Wernersche Verlagsgesellschaft, 2006 (Memoirs written and illustrated by Mazura, in German).

External links 
 
 
 
 On video (YouTube): Alberich curses the ring Wolfgang Wagner's Ring production 1974
 On video (YouTube): Dr. Schoen spills the beans (in Lulu) Alban Berg, Lulu, Act 1 sc 2. Stratas, Tear, Mazura. Boulez, Chereau

1924 births
2020 deaths
Musicians from Salzburg
Officers Crosses of the Order of Merit of the Federal Republic of Germany
Österreichischer Kammersänger
Hochschule für Musik Detmold alumni
20th-century Austrian male opera singers
21st-century Austrian male opera singers